Yu Jianfeng (born 29 January 1989) is a Chinese footballer currently playing as a left-footed midfielder for Jiangxi Beidamen.

Career statistics

Club
.

References

External links

1989 births
Living people
Chinese footballers
Association football midfielders
China League One players
China League Two players
Guangdong Sunray Cave F.C. players
Meizhou Hakka F.C. players
Nantong Zhiyun F.C. players